The 1920 United States House of Representatives elections in South Carolina were held on November 2, 1920 to select seven Representatives for two-year terms from the state of South Carolina.  Four incumbents were re-elected and all three open seats were retained by the Democrats.  The composition of the state delegation thus remained solely Democratic.

1st congressional district
Incumbent Democratic Congressman Richard S. Whaley of the 1st congressional district, in office since 1913, opted to retire.  W. Turner Logan defeated F.F. Carroll in the Democratic primary and Republican challenger Saspartas in the general election.

Democratic primary

General election results

|-
| 
| colspan=5 |Democratic hold
|-

2nd congressional district
Incumbent Democratic Congressman James F. Byrnes of the 2nd congressional district, in office since 1911, was unopposed in his bid for re-election.

General election results

|-
| 
| colspan=5 |Democratic hold
|-

3rd congressional district
Incumbent Democratic Congressman Frederick H. Dominick of the 3rd congressional district, in office since 1917, defeated W.W. Bradley in the Democratic primary and was unopposed in the general election.

Democratic primary

General election results

|-
| 
| colspan=5 |Democratic hold
|-

4th congressional district
Incumbent Democratic Congressman Samuel J. Nicholls of the 4th congressional district, in office since 1915, opted to retire.  John J. McSwain won the Democratic primary and was unopposed in the general election.

Democratic primary

General election results

|-
| 
| colspan=5 |Democratic hold
|-

5th congressional district
Incumbent Democratic Congressman William F. Stevenson of the 5th congressional district, in office since 1917, was unopposed in his bid for re-election.

General election results

|-
| 
| colspan=5 |Democratic hold
|-

6th congressional district
Incumbent Democratic Congressman Philip H. Stoll of the 6th congressional district, in office since 1919, was unopposed in his bid for re-election.

General election results

|-
| 
| colspan=5 |Democratic hold
|-

7th congressional district
Incumbent Democratic Congressman Edward C. Mann of the 7th congressional district, in office since 1919, was defeated in the Democratic primary by Hampton P. Fulmer.  He defeated Republican challenger L.A. Hawkins in the general election.

Democratic primary

General election results

|-
| 
| colspan=5 |Democratic hold
|-

See also
1920 United States House of Representatives elections
1920 South Carolina gubernatorial election
South Carolina's congressional districts

References

"Report of the Secretary of State to the General Assembly of South Carolina.  Part II." Reports of State Officers Boards and Committees to the General Assembly of the State of South Carolina. Volume I. Columbia, SC: 1921, pp. 62–65.

South Carolina
1920
1920 South Carolina elections